The term Saint Grottlesex refers to several American prep boarding schools in New England. These schools have historically sent their graduates to the nation's most prestigious universities. All the schools are members of the Independent School League, except St. Paul's, which left the ISL in 2016.

The schools are:
St. Mark's School
St. Paul's School
St. George's School
Groton School
Middlesex School

The term is a portmanteau of the St. part of  St. Mark's, St. Paul's, and St. George's, then part of Groton, an extra t, and then ended with Middlesex. The St. Grottlesex schools were founded in the nineteenth century for well-to-do Episcopal Church boys (excepting nondenominational Middlesex, founded in 1901), and were consciously styled as the American equivalent of famous English public schools.

In contrast, the Academies, notably Andover, Exeter, Milton, and Deerfield, were generally founded in the late eighteenth century as places to "combine scholarship with more than a little Puritan hellfire" and were originally often the first educational step in preparing men for the Puritan ministry.

The St. Grottlesex schools retain an aura of preppy establishment.

References

Private schools in the United States
Independent School League